Lee & Low Books is an independent children's book publisher focusing on diversity.

History
Lee & Low was founded in 1991 by Chinese Americans Tom Low and Philip Lee as a children's book publisher specializing in books featuring people of color and one of the few minority-owned publishing companies in the United States. Low says, "There was a void in children's books. Most of the books were targeted to Caucasians or contained animals or fairy tales. There was nothing dealing with contemporary issues and people of color.". Lee & Low published its first list in 1993 and immediately gained attention when its first book, Baseball Saved Us was given a full-page review in The New York Times Book Review.

In 1997, founder Tom Low's sons, Jason Low and Craig Low, joined Lee & Low, and in 2004, founder Philip Lee retired.

Lee & Low Books publishes primarily picture books, but in recent years has also published a small number of middle grade and young adult titles.

In January 2012, Lee & Low Books acquired the backlist titles of the now-defunct non-profit publisher, Children's Book Press, as well as the latter's existing contracts with authors and illustrators, with the name itself being revived as an imprint of Lee & Low Books.

In 2021, Lee & Low acquired Cinco Puntos Press.

Research
In 2015, Lee & Low Books partnered with St. Catherine University and Assistant Professor Sarah Park Dahlen to conduct the Diversity Baseline Survey (DBS). The objectives were to look at 1) Gender 2) Race/ethnicity 3) Sexual Orientation 4) Disability in the publishing industry.

The Diversity Baseline Survey (DBS) was sent to 1,524 reviewer employees and 11,713 publishing employees for a total of 13,237 surveys deployed. The DBS survey results confirmed that the publishing industry is overwhelmingly white, at 79%, which corresponded with the numbers from Publishers Weekly annual salary survey.

Arcoiris: books in Spanish
In 1994, Lee & Low began to publish Spanish/English bilingual books and Spanish translations of many of their English titles. The name Arcoiris, Spanish for rainbow, was chosen to reflect the diversity of the books and subject matter.

Bebop Books
Founded in 2000, Bebop Books is an educational imprint of Lee & Low. Bebop Books prints leveled books for early readers in English and Spanish.

Tu Books

Tu Books is an imprint of Lee & Low. Tu Books publishes middle grade and young adult science fiction, fantasy, and mystery featuring people of color or set in worlds inspired by non-Western folklore or culture.

Tu Books was founded as Tu Publishing in 2009 by Stacy Whitman, a freelance children's book editor. In March 2010, Whitman joined Lee & Low as editorial director of the new imprint.

New Voices Award
In 2000, Lee & Low Books established the New Voices Award to encourage writers of color. The award is open to any United States resident of color who has not had a children's picture book published previously. A winner receives $1000 and a standard publication contract, while an Honor Award winner receives $500. While Honor Award winners are not guaranteed publication, several honor books have been published.

New Voices Award recipients

Major awards
Books published by Lee & Low have received several major awards, including some given by the American Library Association, the International Reading Association (IRA), and the New York Public Library.

Major awards won by Lee & Low Books

Notable authors and illustrators
Authors and illustrators with work published by Lee & Low Books include:

Lulu Delacre
Ted Lewin
Betsy Lewin
Joseph Bruchac
Ed Young
Rosa Parks
Carole Boston Weatherford
Pat Mora
David Diaz
George Ancona
John Coy
Lynne Barasch
Benny Andrews
Jim Haskins
Chris Soentpiet
Greg Neri
Kaylani Juanita

See also

Media of New York City
List of publishers of children's books

References

External links
 Lee & Low official website
 Publishing Statistics on Children's Books about People of Color and First/Native Nations and by People of Color and First/Native Nations Authors and Illustrators Documented by the Cooperative Children's Book Center School of Education, University of Wisconsin-Madison
 American Indians in Children's Literature (AICL)

Children's book publishers
Book publishing companies based in New York City
Companies based in New York City
Publishing companies established in 1991
1991 establishments in New York City